The Von Schleicher Cabinet de jure formed the government of Weimar Germany between 3 December 1932 and 28 January 1933 upon the resignation of Franz von Papen. The cabinet was made up of holdovers from Papen's which featured many right-wing independents or German National People's Party (DNVP). The government was followed by the Hitler Cabinet after Schleicher's own resignation. This was to be the last Weimar government before the rise of Nazi Germany.

Composition
The Reich cabinet consisted of the following Ministers:

Actions

During von Schleicher's short time as Chancellor he attempted to prevent the rise of the NSDAP by offering Hitler the Chancellorship in exchange for him remaining as minister of defense however this was rejected. Schleicher eventually agreed to a deal in which Hitler would become Chancellor, von Papen would become Vice-Chancellor and the cabinet would be composed of non-NSDAP members. Schleicher also attempted to split the NSDAP by convincing Gregor Strasser to leave by offering him the Vice-Chancellorship and control of Prussia. After negotiations with Strasser failed he went to Hindenburg with a proposal to declare a state of emergency to control the NSDAP and dissolve the Reichstag, but Hindenburg refused. His final action as Chancellor was to ask Hindenburg once more to declare a state of emergency and when this was refused once more he resigned.

State of Emergency

Schleicher's main goal during his Chancellorship was to have a state of emergency declared by Hindenburg in order to prevent Hitler from gaining power, prevent another election, and to restore stability to the Weimar government. However, he would not declare a state of emergency with his authority and Hindenburg was concerned that he could be impeached for doing so. By January multiple party leaders were demanding another election, with the leader of the Centre party stating that it would be unconstitutional to stall the elections if there was no need for a state of emergency. Following Schleicher's resignation the election was held in March with the NSDAP gaining 92 seats.

References

Historic German cabinets
Weimar Republic
1932 establishments in Germany
1933 disestablishments in Germany
Cabinets established in 1932
Cabinets disestablished in 1933